Godfred Amoah is a Ghanaian professional footballer who plays as a goalkeeper for Ghanaian Premier League side Dreams F.C.

Career 
In 2019, ahead of the 2019–20 Ghana Premier League, he moved to Dreams FC. He made his debut on 5 February 2020, being named on the starting line-up in a 2–1 victory over Liberty Professionals. He went on to make 7 league matches before the league was put on hold and later cancelled as a result of the COVID-19 pandemic.

He was named on the club's squad list for the 2020–21 Ghana Premier League as the club sought push for a top position in the league at the end of the season.

References

External links 

Living people
Year of birth missing (living people)
Association football goalkeepers
Ghanaian footballers
Dreams F.C. (Ghana) players
Ghana Premier League players